Saint Domitius (Domice) of Amiens (fl. 8th century) is a French saint, venerated especially in the diocese of Amiens.

He is remembered for providing spiritual guidance to Saint Ulphia.  Domitius is said to have been a deacon of the church of Amiens who lived on the banks of the Avre River.

One of the statues in the portal of Amiens Cathedral has been identified as Domitius. There is also a painting of Domitius with Saint Ulphia in the cathedral. The painting is attributed to the nineteenth century painter, Jean de Franqueville.

References

External links
Saints of January 31: Ulphia
Domitius (Domice)
Columbia.edu

Saint Domitius
8th-century Frankish saints